Greg Beeman (born 1962 in Honolulu, Hawaii) is an American film and television director and producer and winner of the Directors Guild of America award for Outstanding Directorial Achievement.

He is well known for his work on the television series JAG, Smallville, and Heroes. Beeman worked on the TNT apocalyptic/science-fiction series Falling Skies, as executive producer and main director.

Career

1980s 
Beeman started his directorial career in the late 1980s, guest directing for the television show The Wonder Years, and directing two television films.

In 1988, Beeman made his theatrical directing debut in License to Drive.

1990s 
During the early 1990s, Beeman continued work in the television industry, directing episodes of JAG, Harts of the West, Danger Theatre, and Nash Bridges. Beeman also contributed two episodes to the sci-fi series Eerie, Indiana.

Beeman would work on numerous television projects during the late 1990s, most notably as a recurring director on television series JAG.

2000s 
In 2000, Beeman won a Directors Guild of America award for Outstanding Directorial Achievement in Children's Programs for the television film Miracle in Lane 2.

In 2001, Beeman came on board The WB super-hero series Smallville, as a director and co-executive producer. He later was promoted to executive producer and directed the show's series finale.

In 2003, Beeman was again nominated for a Directors Guild of America award for Outstanding Directorial Achievement in Children's Programs for the television adaptation of A Ring of Endless Light.

In 2006, he became a co-executive producer and director on the NBC series Heroes. He would later be promoted to executive producer. Heroes was nominated for a Hugo Award for Best Dramatic Presentation - Long Form in 2008. Beeman and fellow Heroes' producers were nominated for a PGA Award in the same year.

In 2009, he joined The CW drama Melrose Place, as a director and executive producer.

2010s 
Beeman boarded the TNT science-fiction/action series Falling Skies, as a director and co-executive producer in 2011. In the show's second season, Beeman served as executive producer and primary director.

For the TV series Minority Report and American Gothic, Beeman directed as well as acting as co-executive producer.

Filmography

Feature

Television
TV movies

TV series

References

External links

Greg Beeman's blog

1962 births
American film producers
American television directors
American television producers
American male bloggers
American bloggers
Living people
Artists from Honolulu
Directors Guild of America Award winners
Film directors from Hawaii